Enterospora is a genus of protists belonging to the family Enterocytozoonidae.

Species:

Enterospora canceri 
Enterospora nucleophila

References

Protista